She Devil is a summit in Idaho County, Idaho, in the United States. It forms part of the Seven Devils Mountains. It is considered to be an ultra-prominent peak, one of about 1515 such peaks in the world.

She Devil was named from Nez Perce mythology.

References

Mountains of Idaho County, Idaho
Mountains of Idaho